Abondance is the name of:
 Abondance cheese, a type of cheese
 Abondance (cattle), a breed of cattle
 Abondance, Haute-Savoie, a commune of the Haute-Savoie département in France
Abondance, Martinique
Abondance Ski Valley, a ski area in the Portes du Soleil, France
 Abondance, one of several French navy vessels of that name, and also HMS Abondance

See also
 Abundance (disambiguation)